After Exploitation is a UK-based non-profit organisation using investigative methods to track the unpublished outcomes of modern slavery survivors. The group uses Freedom of Information requests to collate cases of wrongful deportation, detention, and failures by agencies to refer slavery victims for support.

After Exploitation's launch report revealed that 507 potential victims of human trafficking were detained in 2018. A follow-up investigation revealed that 1,256 potential victims were detained in 2019, illustrating a two-fold increase in the number of vulnerable people detained since safeguarding functions were introduced to curb unnecessary use of Immigration Powers.

Background 
After Exploitation was founded as a volunteer-led project in July 2019. Its launch report, Supported or Deported?, revealed the wide-spread use of immigration detention on potential survivors of modern slavery. The report led to significant press and Parliamentary coverage, as the Immigration Minister had previously denied the existence of a data on the basis that the information was not held by Government. In response to the findings, a coalition of more than 20 non-profit organisations - including Amnesty International UK, Anti Slavery International and Freedom United - signed an open letter calling on Government to release hidden data on survivors, and to re-evaluate the Home Office's involvement in delivering support."We ask the government not to wait for public scrutiny to make data on the support, deportation and detention outcomes of trafficking and potential trafficking victims available. We must be assured that these findings will provoke a commitment to transparent reporting on slavery and trafficking outcomes, that any interaction with the national referral mechanism (NRM) will trigger automatic release from detention, and that the Home Office's involvement in both detention gatekeeping and the NRM will be reconsidered." - NGOs addressing Prime Minister Theresa May in The Independent, 17 July 2019After Exploitation is a non-profit company limited by guarantee.

Investigations 
After Exploitation has released a number of research briefings, outlining:

 Detention and deportation of trafficking victims: In two separate briefings, After Exploitation has outlined documented cases of deportation and detention amongst trafficking victims. In 2018, 507 potential victims of trafficking were held in immigration detention, compared with 1,256 potential victims in 2019.
 Voluntary returns of trafficking victims: After Exploitation revealed the growing number of voluntary returns amongst potential victims of trafficking, who are asked to leave the country before potential victims have been able to access full support. Their investigation reveals that more than half (53%) of potential victims leaving the UK before a final decision on their claim were held in prison-like immigration settings beforehand.
 Inconsistent support access: In 2020, research by the group showed that thousands of potential slavery survivors are recognised by first responders such as the police or Gangmasters and Labour Abuse Authority as trafficked, but never referred for support through the NRM. The Human Trafficking Foundation made the case for places of safety for potential survivors, explaining: "People need space to make an informed decision about their future based on an understanding of their rights and options. A referral into the NRM can be a life-changing decision, which does not guarantee long-term stability. A safe place to recover with support to consider options is crucial in allowing people to make the decision that is right for them, which might include a referral to the NRM."

Campaign 
Data transparency

After Exploitation's Supported or Deported? campaign calls for the regular reporting of the following outcomes amongst survivors of modern slavery. The campaign notes that information on returns and detention are already held, whilst additional support outcomes will require a commitment to improved monitoring practices:

 Returns including both voluntary and enforced
 Safety after return monitored by NGOs commissioned through the UK's Voluntary Returns Scheme
 Immigration detention, including in cases where potential victims are not recognised as vulnerable in the Detention Gatekeeping stage
 Support outcomes, including the uptake of entitlements such as safe housing and counselling, enshrined under international law

Nearly 30 non-profit charities and campaigning organisations are signatories to these proposals, including Anti Slavery International, ECPAT, Equality Now, Hope for Justice, Migrant Rights Network, and Women for Refugee Women

References

External links 

 Official website

Human rights organisations based in the United Kingdom
Abolitionism in the United Kingdom
Organizations that combat human trafficking
Contemporary slavery